The Hessian fly or barley midge, Mayetiola destructor, is a species of fly that is a significant pest of cereal crops including wheat, barley and rye. Though a native of Asia, upon its discovery it was believed to have been transported into North America in the straw bedding of Hessian troops during the American Revolution (1775–1783), thus the origin of its common name. However, the report of an inquiry made in 1788 by Sir Joseph Banks states that "no such insect could be found to exist in Germany or any other part of Europe". Nonetheless, it appears that this species, or one exactly like it in habits, had been known for at least a century prior to the American revolution from a locality near Geneva, and also for a long time from some regions in France. 

There are usually two generations a year but may be up to five.  In the spring the dark-coloured female lays about 250 to 300 reddish eggs on plants, usually where the stems are covered by leaves; the larvae feed on the sap and weaken the plants so that they cannot bear grain.

The Hessian fly was described by Thomas Say in 1817.  It is a very harmful insect.  It mainly attacks the stem, although if it is especially hungry it will eat any part of the plant it can find.

In 1836, a severe infestation of Hessian flies resulted in a crop shortage aggravating the financial problems of farmers prior to the Panic of 1837.

Host defense 
M. destructor is one of the most destructive wheat pests worldwide, hence its name. This has brought it much attention from wheat breeder and genetics researchers. As a result the highest number of mapped R genes for resistance to insects in wheat are R genes for this pest specifically, with the unrelated Russian wheat aphid (Diuraphis noxia) also being of serious interest.

References

Cecidomyiinae
Diptera of North America
Insects described in 1817
Taxa named by Thomas Say
Agricultural pest insects